Francesco Mimbelli (16 April 1903, in Livorno – 26 January 1978, in Rome) was an Italian naval officer who fought in World War II.

Biography

Early life

Mimbelli came from a Livornese family with links to Ragusa (modern Dubrovnik). He entered the Italian Naval Academy in 1918 and graduated as an ensign in 1923. In the late 1920s he served on Royal Italian Navy (Regia Marina) gunboats in China. Promoted to lieutenant he served on the Italian delegation to the London Naval Conference in 1930. He subsequently served on the cruiser  moving to the torpedo boat arm in 1937, subsequently being promoted to frigate captain and serving in the Navy Ministry. On the outbreak of war he was appointed to command a torpedo boat flotilla.

Crete
Mimbelli was the commander of torpedo boat  which fought in the Battle of Crete. He was responsible for defending a convoy of two thousand German troops going to Crete in the face of superior British forces. Although the odds were heavily stacked against them (one torpedo boat against the seven ships of Force D) more than two-thirds of the convoy survived due to Mimbelli's maneuvers.

Black Sea
He was later appointed commander of the Italian naval forces based in the Black Sea, where he commanded a flotilla of MAS boats. The Italian motorboats were responsible for sinking two submarines and a transport ship. They also torpedoed the Soviet cruiser  which was not repaired until after the end of the conflict.

Post War
In 1946 Mimbelli joined the Italian Navy (Marina Militare) and was appointed captain of the cruiser . He was subsequently promoted to rear admiral and became commander of the Italian Naval Academy. He retired as a vice admiral in 1964 and died on 26 January 1978, in Rome.

Commemoration
In 1992 the Italian   was named in his honour.

Footnotes

References

1903 births
1978 deaths
Regia Marina personnel of World War II